Zaina is a given name. Notable people with the given name include:

Zaina Agoro, Nigerian American singer-songwriter
Zaina Erhaim, Syrian journalist and feminist
Zaina Hassan (born 2004), Jordanian footballer
Zaina Kapepula (born 1975), Congolese basketball player

See also
Zaina, surname